See also Villamagna for the Italian commune in Abruzzo, or Villa Magna Condominiums in Miami
 Villamagna is the medieval name for the site

Villa Magna is a large ancient imperial Roman villa near the modern town of Anagni, in Lazio, central Italy. The site lies in the Valle del Sacco some 65 km south of Rome, at the foot of the Monti Lepini, directly under the peak known as Monte Giuliano. The toponym 'Villamagna' remains attached to the site, attesting to the local memory of the imperial villa and its successive occupation as a monastery and lay community.

History

The Roman Period
The villa was probably originally constructed in the 2nd century. In 144-145, at the age of 23, the future emperor Marcus Aurelius visited the villa where his adoptive father Antoninus Pius was staying. In letters to his tutor, Fronto, he describes two days spent there:

The excavation has identified the building where the banquet took place, with a large doliarium lying under the pressing floor, where the workers trod the grapes. The doliarium was paved with precious marble, as was the banqueting hall in front of it, where the emperor and his guests would have watched the work. In the same building were found the baths where the emperor and his suite bathed. The whole day was interpreted as that of an important festival that marked the beginning of the vendemmia for Latium.

After the death of Antoninus Pius and Marcus Aurelius the property remained in imperial hands. An inscription, now preserved at the Cathedral of Anagni, attests to Septimius Severus's paving of a road leading from Anagni to the villa in 207. It remains to be determined how late the property remained in imperial hands after this moment in the early 3rd century.

The site of the villa today shows little of its former splendour, though excavations are bringing to  light the vast quantities of marble, mosaic and fresco which once decorated it. The remains visible above ground, covering at least a dozen hectares, consist of three ranges of cisterns fed by an aqueduct which probably leads from a spring at the base of the wooded hill, a range of substructures (underlying a 19th-century casale) which were the basis villae for some part of the ancient villa, and various traces of substructures on the long ridge running down from the casale towards the road.

Middle Ages
The earliest document attesting to the monastery dates from the 10th century and describes the foundation of the monastery by three nobles from Anagni. A series of very interesting charters and trials from the eleventh through 13th century speak to a small rural monastery with properties in the area of the original fundus, which despite its meagre size and income managed to become embroiled in regional and papal politics of the central Middle Ages, culminating in the suppression of the monastery in 1297 by Pope Boniface VIII. After the death of the monastery, the village remained at least for a little while, however, as it is referred to as a castrum in 1301 and 1333, and a castrum dirutum in 1478. The castrum walls and church are still standing today.

Current research
Between 2006 and 2010, the site and its occupation in the Roman and medieval period were the focus of an international interdisciplinary project, sponsored by the University of Pennsylvania's Museum of Archaeology and Anthropology (Mediterranean Section), the British School at Rome, and the Soprintendenza ai Beni Archeologici del Lazio, with core funding from the 1984 Foundation, the Comune of Anagni and the BancAnagni Credito Cooperativo. The international project was directed by Elizabeth Fentress; with co-directors Andrew Wallace Hadrill (BSR) and Sandra Gatti (SBAL). The field directors were Caroline Goodson and Marco Maiuro. Five years of research, conducted using remote sensing survey, open area excavation, field survey, and topographic survey conducted in collaboration with the Consiglio Nazionale della Ricerca Scientifica (CNRS) have revealed the majority of the plan of the Roman buildings, a spectacular wine-making/dining room complex (probably the same room described by Marcus Aurelius in his letter), what appears to be the slave quarters of the villa, a winery of the 6th century. an early medieval village and a complex, long-lived  cemetery around the monastic church of S. Pietro in Villamagna.  The excavation is published, (E. Fentress, C. Goodson and M. Maiuro, with M. Andrews and A. Dufton, eds., Villa Magna, An Imperial Estate and its Legacies.  Excavations 2006-2010 (Archaeological Monographs of the British School at Rome): the stratigraphy and finds can be found online at http://archaeologydata.brown.edu/villamagna/

Notes

External links
 The website of the excavation project
 the preliminary reports of the site from 2006, 2007, 2008, 2009 and 2010 at FastiOnline
 the stratigraphic and finds report, including coins, glass, pottery, statues and human remains.

Sources
M. Mazzolani, Anagnia (Forma Italiae, Regio I, vol. 6) (Rome, 1969).
E. De Minicis, “Il monastero di Villamagna e il suo territorio nell’alto medioevo", in Bollettino dell’Istituto di storia e di arte del Lazio meridionale 11 (1979–1982), pp. 59–75.
A. Scarpignato, "Villamagna dalla metà del secolo XII e i suoi rapporti con gli abitanti di Sgurgola e Gorga", in Bollettino dell’Istituto di storia e di arte del Lazio meridionale 11 (1979–1982), pp. 77–91.
R. Motta, “Decadenza del monastero di Villamagna dalla fine del XIII secolo", in Bollettino dell’Istituto di storia e di arte del Lazio meridionale 11 (1979–1982), pp. 93–103.
Monasticon Italiae. I. Roma e Lazio, ed. F. Caraffa (Cesena, 1981), pp. 122–3, n. 28.
S. Carocci, "Ricerche e fonti sui poteri signorili nel Lazio meridionale nella prima metà del XIII secolo: Villamagna e Civitella", in Il sud del Patrimonium Sancti Petri al confine del Regnum nei primi trent’anni del Duecento. Due realtà a confronto, Atti delle giornate di studi, Ferentino 28-29-30 ottobre 1994 (Rome, 1997), pp. 112–44.
C. D. Flascassovitti, Le Pergamene del Monastero di S. Pietro di Villamagna (976-1237) (Lecce, 1994).
M. De Meo, "S. Pietro di Villamagna presso Anagni: una villa romana si trasforma in abbazia", Quaderni di architettura e restauro, 2 (Rome, 1998).
G. Giammaria, ed. "Villamagna", Monumenti di Anagni 3 (Anagni, 1999).
E. Fentress, S. Gatti, C. Goodson, S. Hay, A. Kuttner, M. Maiuro, "Excavations at Villa Magna", Fasti Online Documents & Research: 68 
E. Fentress, C. Fenwick, C. Goodson, S. Hay, M. Maiuro, "Excavations at Villa Magna", Fasti Online Documents & Research: 97 
D.Booms, F.Candilio, A. Di Miceli, C. Fenwick, E. Fentress, C. Goodson, M. McNamee, S. Privitera, R. Ricciardi. "Excavations at Villa Magna 2008". FOLD&R: 126.
E. Fentress, C. Goodson, M. Maiuro. 2009. "Excavations at Villa Magna 2009". FOLD&R: 169.
E. Fentress, C. Goodson, M. Maiuro,"Excavations at Villa Magna 2010". FOLD&R: 207. 
E. Fenress, C. Goodson, M. Maiuro, M. Andrews, A Dufton Villa Magna.  An Imperial Estate and its Legacies.  Excavations 2006-2010 Archaeological Monographs of the British School at Rome 23.

Houses completed in the 2nd century
Magna
Monasteries in Lazio